A total lunar eclipse took place at the Moon's descending node of the orbit on Tuesday, September 16, 1997, the second of two lunar eclipses in 1997. A shallow total eclipse saw the Moon in relative darkness for 1 hour, 1 minute and 30.8 seconds. The Moon was 19.094% of its diameter into the Earth's umbral shadow, and should have been significantly darkened. The partial eclipse lasted for 3 hours, 16 minutes and 28.2 seconds in total. The penumbral eclipse lasted for 5 hours, 8 minutes and 20.1 seconds. The partial eclipse lasted for 3 hours, 16 minutes and 28.2 seconds. The total eclipse lasted for 1 hour, 1 minute and 30.8 seconds. Maximum eclipse was at 18:46:39.1 UTC. The moon's apparent diameter was extremely large (6.3% larger than average) because occurred only 3 hours and 21 minutes past perigee. The Moon was only 356,986 km (221,820 mi) of the Earth at greatest eclipse.

This eclipse was the fourth and last of an almost tetrad (that occurred when there were 4 consecutive lunar eclipses that had an umbral eclipse magnitude of 0.9 or greater). The others were 04 Apr 1996 (T), 27 Sep 1996 (T) and 24 Mar 1997 (P).

This eclipse was the 25th eclipse in Saros series 137 (lunar eclipse), descending node. The previous event was on Thursday, September 6, 1979. The next event was on Monday, September 28, 2015.

Visibility 

It was visible from all of Africa, Europe, Asia, and Australia.

Related eclipses

Eclipses of 1997 
 A total solar eclipse on March 9.
 A partial lunar eclipse on March 24.
 A partial solar eclipse on September 2.
 A total lunar eclipse on September 16.

Lunar year series 

This is the third of four lunar year eclipses at the descending node of the moon's orbit.

Saros series
It is part of Saros series 137.

Half-Saros cycle
A lunar eclipse will be preceded and followed by solar eclipses by 9 years and 5.5 days (a half saros). This lunar eclipse is related to two annular solar eclipses of Solar Saros 144.

See also 
List of lunar eclipses
List of 20th-century lunar eclipses

References

External links 
 Prof. Druckmüller's eclipse photography site. Czech Republic
 Saros cycle 137
 
 The EAAE Lunar Eclipse Project September 16, 1997
 Total Lunar Eclipses seen from Cape Town Total lunar eclipse, September 16, 1997.
 Total Lunar Eclipse September 16, 1997, Western Australia

1997-09
1997 in science
September 1997 events